Leet is a written language evolved for communication over the Internet.

Leet or LEET may also refer to:

Law
 Leet, the jurisdiction of a Court leet, a type of court common in the Middle Ages, or the court itself
 Legal Education Eligibility Test, a South Korean test modeled on the US Law School Admission Test

Places
 Leet Township, Pennsylvania, in Allegheny County, Pennsylvania, US
 Leet, West Virginia, an unincorporated community in Lincoln County, West Virginia, US
 Leets Vale, New South Wales, a village near Sydney, Australia

Other uses
 Leat or Leet, any of certain types of artificial watercourse or aqueduct dug into the ground
 Leet (programming language), an esoteric computer-programming language
 Leet (surname), including a list of people with that name
 Leet O'Brien, partner in the American architectural firm Northrup & O'Brien
 Leet-ale, a type of parish ale

See also
 Ryan Leet, an ocean-going salvage tug
 Leete (disambiguation)